Géza Fazakas (born 18 January 1990 in Budapest) is a Hungarian football player who currently plays for Vác FC.

Club career

Budapest Honved
He made his debut of 3 April 2009 against Győri ETO FC in a match where he earned his first red card of his professional career after only 25 minutes of football in a match that ended 0–0.

Personal life

Fazakas lives with his partner, Orsolya, with whom he has a son.

Club honours

Budapest Honvéd FC
Hungarian Cup:
Winner: 2008–09
Hungarian Super Cup:
Runners-up: 2009

References

External links

UEFA Official Website
Player profile at HLSZ

1990 births
Living people
Footballers from Budapest
Hungarian footballers
Hungary youth international footballers
Association football defenders
Budapest Honvéd FC players
BKV Előre SC footballers
Soproni VSE players
Vác FC players
Kisvárda FC players
III. Kerületi TUE footballers
Nemzeti Bajnokság I players